Darrin Brown (born October 28, 1970) is a Canadian 1st Assistant Director and former actor best known for his role as Dwayne Myers on the Degrassi television series.

Brown was born in Toronto, Ontario. In 1992, Brown received a Bachelor of Applied Arts degree in Radio and Television Arts from Ryerson Polytechnical Institute (now Toronto Metropolitan University). Currently, Brown works predominantly in film as an assistant director.

References

External links

1970 births
Living people
Male actors from Toronto
Canadian male television actors